"Lady Love" is a pop song written by Yvonne Gray alias Vonghn Gray. The sheet music has the songwriter as Von Gray the sole writer, however; the strings were the arrangement of Belford Hendricks. The Producers were Von Gray and Jack Faith. It became a hit single cut from Lou Rawls' 1977 album When You Hear Lou, You've Heard It All. It was released as a single in January 1978 and peaked at No. 13 in Canada, No. 21 on Australia's Kent Music Report, No. 24 on the U.S. Billboard Hot 100, No. 20 on Cash Box, and went to No. 21 on the R&B chart.

On the Canadian and U.S. Adult Contemporary charts, "Lady Love" peaked at No. 5.  The song is an airplay staple today on adult standards and smooth jazz radio stations.

Personnel 
Lou Rawls – Vocals
Barbara Ingram, Yvonne Gray, Carla Benton, Yvette Benson – backing vocals
Charles Collins – drums
Michael "Sugarbear" Foreman – bass
Dennis Harris – guitar
Edward Green, Von Gray, Leon Huff – keyboards
Davis Cruse – bongos
Don Renaldo – strings, horns

References

1978 singles
Philadelphia International Records singles
Lou Rawls songs